Raúl Marrero (born 22 January 1951) is a Cuban boxer. He competed in the men's middleweight event at the 1968 Summer Olympics.

References

1951 births
Living people
Cuban male boxers
Olympic boxers of Cuba
Boxers at the 1968 Summer Olympics
Sportspeople from Camagüey
Middleweight boxers